"Music Is My Life" is a song recorded by American-Australian singer Marcia Hines. The song was written by Porter, Wagner, Hines and produced by Robie Porter. The studio version of the song was released in February 1978 and included on Hines' debut live album, Marcia Hines Live Across Australia (1978).

Track listing
 7" Single (MS 510)
Side A "Music Is My Life" (Porter, Wagner, Hines) - 2:07
Side B "Empty" (Porter) -

Charts

Weekly charts

Cover versions
"Music is My Life" has been covered by Helen Reddy and Mac Davis.  Davis' version reached number six on the Canadian Adult Contemporary chart.

References

Songs about music
Marcia Hines songs
1977 songs
1978 singles